Gudrun Stock (born 23 May 1995) is a German professional racing cyclist. She rode at the 2015 UCI Track Cycling World Championships. She competed at the 2016 Summer Olympic as a member of the German women's pursuit team. The team finished in 9th place.

Major results
2013
 4th Road race, National Junior Road Championships
2015
2nd  Team pursuit, UEC European U23 Track Championships (with Lisa Klein, Anna Knauer and Mieke Kroeger)
3rd Omnium, Cottbuser Nächte
 9th Time Trial, National Road Championships
2020
 4th Road race, National Road Championships
2021
 1st  Sprints classification Healthy Ageing Tour

References

External links
 

1995 births
Living people
German female cyclists
People from Deggendorf
Sportspeople from Lower Bavaria
Olympic cyclists of Germany
Cyclists at the 2016 Summer Olympics
Cyclists from Bavaria
21st-century German women